Junchen (Old Chinese (ZS): *kun-gin; r. 161–126 BCE) was the son and successor to Laoshang Chanyu. As chanyu of the Xiongnu Empire, Junchen outlived the Han emperors Wen (r. 180–157 BC), Jing (r. 157–141 BC). He died during the reign of the Emperor Wu of Han (r. 141–87 BC). All three Han emperors confirmed the heqin peace and kinship treaty with the Xiongnu.

Life
Junchen succeeded his father, Laoshang Chanyu, in 161 BCE.

Although peace with the Han dynasty generally persisted under his reign, Xiongnu raids still occurred in the years 158, 148, 144, and 142. The Chinese annals note that mutual relations were imperiled on a number of occasions, which included appeals of the Chinese contenders for the Xiongnu's assistance and protection, the Xiongnu's retaliatory raids as punishments for violation of the treaty terms, and one direct Chinese assault against the chanyu. The Xiongnu were especially sensitive about unimperiled trade relations, which were one of the terms of the heqin treaty, and the Chinese annals specifically note a number of instances of the border trade opening, implying that the border trade was at times banned.

In the summer of 133 BCE, Junchen led a force of 100,000 to attack Mayi in Shuofang, Dai Commandery. Wang Hui and two other generals attempted to ambush the Xiongnu at Mayi with a large force of 300,000, but Junchen retreated after learning about the ambush from a captured local warden. Wang Hui decided not to give chase and was sentenced to death. He committed suicide. The Han army abandoned chariots after this point.

The ambush happened in the 133 BCE, when Junchen Chanyu was lured inside the border, and he almost run into an ambush of a 300,000 strong Chinese army. Only a disclosure by a Chinese officer about the planned ambush saved the Chanyu. After the failed ambush, the treaty was practically abrogated, the relations soured, the border traders were assaulted, in 127 BC the Chinese army attacked and expelled the Xiongnu tribes Loufan and Bayan (白羊王) from the Ordos, and then built fortifications and forts to retain the captured territory.

In the spring of 129 BC, Wei Qing and three other generals led a cavalry force of 40,000 in an attack on the Xiongnu at the frontier markets of Shanggu. Wei Qing successfully killed several thousand Xiongnu and took 700 prisoners. General Gongsun Ao was defeated and lost 7,000 men. He was reduced to commoner status. Li Guang was defeated and captured but managed to escape by feigning death and returned to base. He was reduced to commoner status. Gongsun He failed to find the Xiongnu. That winter the Xiongnu attacked Yuyang in You Province in retaliation.

In the autumn of 128 BC, Wei Qing and Li Xi led a force of 40,000 and defeated the Xiongnu north of Yanmen Commandery.

In 126 BC, the Xiongnu led a force of 90,000 under the Wise King (Tuqi) of the Right to attack Dai Commandery, killing its grand administrator Gong You. They also raided Dingxiang and Shang, taking several thousand captives. Junchen died in the same year and his younger brother, a Eastern Luli-Prince Yizhixie Chanyu (or Ichisye) ascended the throne (r. 126-114 BCE).

Footnotes

References
Bichurin N.Ya., Collection of information on peoples in Central Asia in ancient times, vol. 1, Sankt Petersburg, 1851, reprint Moscow-Leningrad, 1950

Chanyus
2nd-century BC rulers in Asia